The 2018–19 Liga EBA season is the 25th season of the Spanish basketball fourth league. The season started on 22 September 2018 and will end on 19 May 2019 with the promotion playoffs to LEB Plata.

Competition format
Teams are divided in five groups attending to geographical criteria. Groups A, C, D and E are divided in two.

Regular season
Group A–A: Basque Country, Cantabria, Castile and León and Navarre.
Group A–B: Asturias, Galicia and Castile and León.
Group B: Community of Madrid, Castile-La Mancha and Canary Islands.
Group C–A: Aragon, Catalonia and Balearic Islands.
Group C–B: Andorra, Aragon, Catalonia and Balearic Islands.
Group D–A: Andalusia and Melilla.
Group D–B: Andalusia and Extremadura.
Group E–A: Valencian Community.
Group E–B: Valencian Community and Region of Murcia.

Final stage
The three best teams of each group and the fourth of Group A (champion of the previous season) will play the promotion playoffs. From these 16 teams, only six will be promoted to LEB Plata.

Since this season, only two teams will host one of the two final stages. Each final stage consist in two groups of four teams where the group winners will promote directly to LEB Plata.

The two runners-up from each stage will play a final match for the two last spots.

Eligibility of players
The Spanish Basketball Federation limited the number of non-EU players to only two and forced the clubs to have at least eight homegrown players.

Regular season

Group A
The 28 teams of the group were divided into two subgroups, where the two first qualified teams of each one would join the final stage. The two group winners will face for deciding the first and second position of the group; the same for the two runners-up, deciding the positions third and fourth.

Group A–A

Group A–B

Finals

First-qualified teams playoff
The winner of this single-legged series qualified as group A champion. The game was played on 4 May at Municipal of Zizur Nagusia.

|}

Group B
The three top teams will join the final stage.

Group C
As in the group A, the 28 teams were divided into two subgroups, where the two first qualified teams of each one would join the Final Four for deciding the three participant teams in the final stage.

Group C–A

Group C–B

Finals

Final Four
The winner, runner-up and third place game winner qualifies for the final stage. The games were played on 4 and 5 May at Pavelló Barris Nord of Lleida.

Relegation playoffs
Winners remained at Liga EBA. First leg was played on 5 May, second on 11.

|}

Group D
20 teams were divided into two groups. The five first teams of each group joined the second stage, where the best three teams will join the final stage.

Regular season

Group D–A

Group D–B

Second stage

Group D–Qualification

Group D–Relegation

Group E
17 teams were divided into two groups. The four first teams of each group joined the second stage, where the best three teams will join the final stage.

Regular season

Group E–A

Group E–B

Second stage

Group E–Qualification

Group E–Relegation

Promotion playoffs
The 16 qualified teams will be divided in four groups of four teams. The winner of each group will promote to LEB Plata. The four runners-up will play a repechage to decide two more promotion spots.

Group A – Ponferrada

Group 1

Group 2

Repechage

Group B – Algeciras

Group 3

Group 4

Repechage

References

External links
Liga EBA at FEB.es 

Liga EBA seasons
EBA